Haavard Martinsen (6 February 1879 – 2 August 1967) was a Norwegian chemist and industrial leader.

He was born in Nedre Eiker to Gustav Martinsen and Johanna Jeremiassen. He graduated as chemist from the University of Dresden in 1902. From 1918 to 1949 he was director of the mill Bjølsen Valsemølle. He served as mayor of Kristiania from 1920 to 1922. He was decorated Knight, First Class of the Order of St. Olav in 1939, was Commander of the French Legion of Honour, Grand Officer of the Order of Orange-Nassau, and was awarded the Order of the British Empire.

References

1879 births
1967 deaths
People from Nedre Eiker
Norwegian chemists
Norwegian industrialists
Mayors of Oslo
Conservative Party (Norway) politicians
Commandeurs of the Légion d'honneur
Grand Officers of the Order of Orange-Nassau
Members of the Order of the British Empire